Perfect Timing is a collaborative mixtape by Canadian rapper and record producer Nav and American record producer Metro Boomin. It was released on July 21, 2017, by Boominati Worldwide, XO, and Republic Records. The mixtape contains production from Metro Boomin, Nav, Pi'erre Bourne, and Southside among others, and features guest appearances from Lil Uzi Vert, Playboi Carti, Offset, 21 Savage, Nav's fellow labelmate Belly, and Gucci Mane. It was supported by two singles: "Perfect Timing (Intro)" and "Call Me".

Background
Before Perfect Timing was released, Nav and Metro Boomin both produced the former's song "Up", from his self-titled debut mixtape and first project (2017).

On July 21, 2017, the same day the mixtape was released, Nav sat down for an interview with Paul Thompson of Complex. He described it as "more serious" and it features instrumentals that are different from those of what Metro Boomin regularly produces. Explaining his decision to emotionally rap about women, he explained that "you don't know who's fake and who's real" and "especially with girls: they could do anything for me and there's still that kind of guard up".

Release and promotion
Initially announced in early 2017, the artwork and release date was unveiled on July 12, 2017. Two days later, the songs "Perfect Timing (Intro)" and "Call Me" were released as singles on July 14, 2017.

Commercial performance
Perfect Timing debuted at number 13 on the US Billboard 200 earning 30,000 album-equivalent units with 6,000 in pure album sales in its first week. In its second week, the album fell to number 24 on the chart selling 15,000 units, bringing its two-week total to 45,000 units. On September 8, 2020, the mixtape was certified gold by the Recording Industry Association of America (RIAA) for combined sales and album-equivalent units of over 500,000 units in the United States.

Critical reception
Scott Glaysher of HipHopDX did not like Nav's vocals on any song from Perfect Timing, but he praised the instrumentals that were created by Metro Boomin and some other fellow record producers on some songs. Writing for Pitchfork, Jay Balfour said that the project shows that "Nav is empty as he ever was, lyrically especially" and the "brooding, soft-synthed trap" instrumentals created by Metro "would be in familiar and more capable hands if the guests were alone with them, but they aren’t enough of a saving grace". Spectrum Cultures Daniel Bromfield opined that Nav "has proved himself nothing more than Pandora filler, providing nothing but rap in a pinch" and Metro "should have should have blown this one up a little more" to make it more upbeat.

Track listing
Credits adapted from Tidal.

Notes
  signifies a co-producer
 "ASAP Ferg" is stylized as "A$AP Ferg"
 "Did You See Nav?" is stylized as "Did You See NAV?"
 "NavUziMetro#Pt2" is stylized in all-caps

Personnel
Credits adapted from Tidal.

Performers
 Nav – primary artist
 Lil Uzi Vert – featured artist 
 Offset – featured artist 
 Playboi Carti – featured artist 
 21 Savage – featured artist 
 Belly – featured artist 
 Gucci Mane – featured artist 

Production
 Metro Boomin – producer 
 Southside – producer 
 Nav – producer 
 Cubeatz – co-producer 
 Pi'erre Bourne – producer 
 DannyBoyStyles – producer 
 Trouble Trouble – co-producer 

Technical
 Joe LaPorta – mastering engineer , mixer 
 Kuldeep Chudasama – recording engineer 
 Tomi Fischer – assistant recording engineer 
 Alex Tumay – mixer 
 Danny Schofield – recording engineer 
 Raph Mesquita – assistant recording engineer 
 Amadxus - assistant recording engineer 
 Nav – mixer , recording engineer 
 Ethan Stevens – mixer , recording engineer 
 Shin Kamiyama – recording engineer

Charts

Weekly charts

Year-end charts

Certifications

References

2017 mixtape albums
Metro Boomin albums
Albums produced by Nav (rapper)
Albums produced by Metro Boomin
Albums produced by Southside (record producer)
Albums produced by Cubeatz
Albums produced by Pi'erre Bourne
Nav (rapper) albums
Republic Records albums
Cloud rap albums
Pop-rap albums